Fateh Lohani (1920 – 12 April 1975) was a Bangladeshi actor, film director, writer and journalist.

Education
Lohani passed Matriculation examination from St Mary's Cathedral Mission High School in Calcutta. He completed his IA and BA degrees from Ripon College in Kolkata. In 1950, he went to London and completed a two years course on drama producing at the Oldwick Theatre School. He took film education as a member of the British Film Institute.
.

Career
Lohani was involved in publication of the monthly literature magazine Agatya since 1949. In 1949, he joined the Karachi Radio and later, BBC. He returned to Dhaka in 1954 and started producing films and simultaneously, worked in radio, acted in drama and carried out the profession of writing. He was the first director of a feature film after the establishment of Film Development Corporation in 1957.

Some of the dramas written by Lohani are Nibhrita Sanglap, Dur Thekey Kachhey and Sagar Dola. He translated some dramas such as Death of a Salesman by Arthur Miller, Lazarus Laughed and Mourning Becomes Electra by Eugene O'Neill,  and The Old Man and the Sea by Ernest Hemingway.

Personal life and death
Lohani was married to Razia Lohani, a previous head teacher of Kamrunnessa Government Girls High School and a lecturer of Eden Mohila College and Home Economics College, who died on 26 February 2022 in a hospital located in Dhaka, at the age of 96. Lohani had a brother Fazle Lohani and a sister Husna Banu Khanam.

Lohani died on 12 April 1975 while he was shooting his film Kuasha at Kaptai, Chittagong.

Works
Actor

Director
 Akash Ar Mati (1959)
 Asiya (1960)
 Sat Rang (1965, Urdu)
 Balyabhandhu (1968)

Awards
 President Award and Nigar Prize of Pakistan (1961)
 Mazid Almakki Award of Pakistan (1968)
 Bangladesh Film Journalists Association Award (1975)
 Silver Jubilee Trophy of FDC (1983)

References

Footnotes

Bibliography

External links
 

1920 births
1975 deaths
People from Sirajganj District
Bangladeshi male film actors
Bangladeshi film directors
Bangladeshi journalists
20th-century journalists
Pakistani expatriates in the United Kingdom
Pakistani male actors